Oreichthys duospilus is a small cyprinid fish endemic to the Sharavati River basin in Karnataka.

References

Fish of India
Oreichthys
Fish described in 2015